Burlington station is an Amtrak train station in Burlington, Iowa, United States. It is served by the California Zephyr, with one daily train in each direction. The station was built by the Chicago, Burlington and Quincy Railroad (CB&Q) in 1944, replacing the previous union station used by the CB&Q and the Chicago, Rock Island and Pacific Railroad. That station burned in January 1943.

Burlington station is served by the local transit operator, Burlington Urban Service. Via the local buses, connections are also possible at the West Burlington intercity bus stop, from which Burlington Trailways operates.

References

External links 

Amtrak stations in Iowa
Former Chicago, Burlington and Quincy Railroad stations
Railway stations in the United States opened in 1947
Buildings and structures in Burlington, Iowa
Transportation buildings and structures in Des Moines County, Iowa
Railway stations on the National Register of Historic Places in Iowa
National Register of Historic Places in Des Moines County, Iowa
Former Burlington, Cedar Rapids and Northern Railway stations
Moderne architecture in Iowa
Railway stations in the United States opened in 1944
1947 establishments in Iowa